A wojski (Medieval Latin: tribunus, hence sometimes rendered into English as tribune) was an officer in medieval Poland, responsible for the security of voivodeships or districts at times when voivods and castellans had accompanied the szlachta (nobility) to war.

With time, the wojskis responsibilities were taken over by starostas, and wojski became an honorary district office in the Polish–Lithuanian Commonwealth.

 Wojski koronny - Crown Wojski 
 Wojski litewski - Lithuanian Wojski
 Wojski większy - Major Wojski
 Wojski mniejszy - Minor Wojski 
 Wojski grodzki - City Wojski
 Wojski zamkowy''' - Castle Wojski''

References 

Polish titles
Military ranks of Poland
Lithuanian titles
Military ranks of Lithuania